Belemnobatis is an extinct genus of ray from the Mesozoic era. As with most basal batoids, its exact placement within its order and the relationships between species are poorly understood. In addition, the line between this genus and Spathobatis is unclear. It is possible this genus is a wastebasket taxon. It is known from many sites of both Jurassic and Cretaceous age throughout Europe and a single Asian occurrence in the middle Jurassic of Thailand.

References

Rhinobatidae
Prehistoric cartilaginous fish genera